Udim (lit. Firebrands) is a moshav in central Israel. Located near Netanya, it falls under the jurisdiction of Hof HaSharon Regional Council.

History
The moshav was established in 1948 by Holocaust survivors. Its name is taken from the Book of Zechariah (3:2), and symbolises the fact that the founders were survivors of the Holocaust;
And the LORD said unto Satan: 'The LORD rebuke thee, O Satan, yea, the LORD that hath chosen Jerusalem rebuke thee; is not this man a brand plucked out of the fire?

Nature reserve
South-east of the moshav is a nature reserve, first declared in 1967, and expanded in 1997, 140 dunams in total. The reserve is in an old quarry, where the water table has risen, allowing a concentration of aquatic plants to flourish. Flora includes Salix acmophylla and Tamarix trees, Rubus sanguineus, Reeds, and Cattails.

References

Moshavim
Agricultural Union
Populated places established in 1948
Nature reserves in Israel
Populated places in Central District (Israel)
Protected areas of Central District (Israel)
1948 establishments in Israel